Marlon Lamont McClain II, known professionally as Brando, is an American singer and songwriter from Los Angeles, California. He is best known for the song "Body" with Loud Luxury.

Career
In 2018, Brando was featured on the multi-platinum-certified song "Body" with Loud Luxury, who discussed the collaboration by stating that they were originally in Los Angeles and had moved there two years before. In an interview they mentioned how Brando was the recommended singer. After going to a show Brando was performing at, they saw his performance and noticed "he was doing his own project with somebody else." They later collaborated for the song "Body".

Discography

Extended Plays

Singles

As lead artist

As featured artist

References

External links
 

American singer-songwriters
Armada Music artists
Living people
Year of birth missing (living people)